The 1976 Southwestern Louisiana Ragin' Cajuns football team was an American football team that represented the University of Southwestern Louisiana (now known as the University of Louisiana at Lafayette) in the Southland Conference during the 1976 NCAA Division I football season. In their third year under head coach Augie Tammariello, the team compiled a 7–4 record. The Conference forfeited their victories over Fresno State and Cincinnati later in the season after they determined two ineligible players were on the Cajuns roster.

Schedule

References

Southwestern Louisiana
Louisiana Ragin' Cajuns football seasons
Southwestern Louisiana Ragin' Cajuns football